The Everton Methodist Church, formerly the Everton School, is located on Main Street in Everton, Arkansas.  Its building, a single-story stone structure with Craftsman styling, was built in 1939 with funding from the Works Progress Administration, and served as the local school from 1939 to 1959.  The building was listed on the National Register of Historic Places in 1992 for its role in the educational history of the area.

See also
National Register of Historic Places listings in Boone County, Arkansas

References

School buildings on the National Register of Historic Places in Arkansas
Methodist churches in Arkansas
National Register of Historic Places in Boone County, Arkansas
Education in Boone County, Arkansas
1939 establishments in Arkansas
School buildings completed in 1939
Works Progress Administration in Arkansas
Bungalow architecture in Arkansas
American Craftsman architecture in Arkansas